Olevsk (translit. Olévs’k) is a city in Korosten Raion, Zhytomyr Oblast, Ukraine. As of January 2022 its population was approximately

History

Olevsk was first mentioned in 1488. In 1641 Olevsk was granted Magdeburg city rights by Polish King Władysław IV Vasa.

Later it became a town in Volhynian Governorate of the Russian Empire.

During World War II on November 15 or 21, 1941, members of Taras Bulba-Borovets' Ukrainian People's Revolutionary Army collaborated with the German administration in taking more than 500 Jews from Olevsk to Varvarivka, where they were murdered.

Gallery

References

Cities in Zhytomyr Oblast
Cities of district significance in Ukraine
Volhynian Voivodeship (1569–1795)
Ovruchsky Uyezd
Holocaust locations in Ukraine